Neapoli is a village in the municipal unit of Vouprasia, Elis, Greece. It is located in the low hills west of the Movri hills, 5 km southeast of Varda, 4 km north of Nisi, 5 km west of Mataragka and 39 km north of Pyrgos. Neapoli had a population of 153 in 2011.

Population

See also
List of settlements in Elis

References

External links
 Neapoli on the GTP Travel Pages

Populated places in Elis
Vouprasia